Jhinder Bondi is a 1961 Indian Bengali-language historical drama film produced by Bholanath Roy under his banner B.N Productions and directed by the legendary Tapan Sinha, starring Uttam Kumar, Soumitra Chatterjee, Arundhati Devi and Tarun Kumar in lead role. Uttam Kumar played dual role in this film. Film music composed by Ustad Ali Akbar Khan. The film become successful at the box office.

The film was based on a novel of same name ঝিন্দের বন্দী written by Saradindu Bandyopadhyay, though the ending has been totally altered from that in the novel, whose base plot was adapted from the 1894 novel The Prisoner of Zenda by Anthony Hope. The book had already been adapted into English-language films in 1937 and 1952, and later, in 1979.  Soumitra Chatterjee is cast, uncharacteristically, in a villain role in the film. Sarod maestro Ali Akbar Khan directs the music.

Plot
A person comes to meet Gauri Shankar Roy (Uttam Kumar), who lives in Kolkata. He introduces himself as a 'fauji Sardar' (Chief of the Armed Forces) of Jhind, a small kingdom in Madhya Pradesh. He says that the to-be King of Jhind, Shankar Singh, was found missing from the kingdom right before his coronation; this is apparently a conspiracy by his own brother Udit Singh, who wants the kingdom for himself. Earlier, too, there were two occasions when coronation was arranged, but on both occasions, the King was found missing. Udit is a cruel man, unfit to be a good king. Shankar Singh has his vices too, but is a kind-hearted person who would care for his citizens and is thus worthy to be king. Now, coincidentally, Gauri looks exactly like Shankar Singh (also played by Uttam Kumar). This being the last hope, the fauji Sardar requests him to pretend to be the King for the coronation and until the real King can be found. Gauri agrees. The two set off for Jhind.

Things aren't easy at the Palace in Jhind. Despite the great luxury of kingly life, Gauri is constantly threatened by Udit and his friend, the dashingly handsome but evil Mayurvahan (Soumitra Chatterjee). The coronation however takes place successfully; moreover, the pretend King becomes engaged to Rani Kasturi Bai (Arundhati Devi) on the occasion. In spite of the situation becoming more and more tense, with the life of the King at stake, a romance blooms between Kasturi Bai and Gauri.
 
A secret agent reveals that the real King is hidden in a fortress owned by Udit, who will murder him as soon as he gets rid of Gauri. The fauji Sardar then reveals to Gauri in secret that Gauri deserves the throne as much as Shankar or Udit because they were all the sons of the then-Dewan of Jhind, Kali Shankar Roy. The then-king being issue less, adopted Shankar and Udit as sons.

After a secret entry to the fortress where the King is being held prisoner, Gauri fights a battle with Mayurvahan, finally killing him as well as surprising and killing Udit. As he approaches his look-alike Shankar Singh, he has a momentary desire to kill the King and gain the kingdom for himself, he being as deserving by blood as Shankar Singh; but his humanity wins over and he approaches the King respectfully, addressing him as "Your Highness". He then bids a last goodbye to Kasturi Bai and mounts a horse to head back to Kolkata.

Cast
 Uttam Kumar as Gauri Shankar Roy/Shankar Singh
 Arundhati Devi as Rani Kasturi Bai
 Soumitra Chatterjee as Mayurvahan
 Radhamohan Bhattacharya as Fauji Sardar of Jhind
 Tarun Kumar as Udit Singh, Brother of Shankar Singh
 Dilip Roy as Rudrarup, a loyal companion of the king
 Sandhya Roy as Champa
 Dhiren Mukherjee

Soundtrack

Production
The film is based on the novel of Saradindu Bandopadhyay of a same name which he itself rewrite of famous English novel Prisoner of Jenda. For the first time two legendary actor of Bengali cinema Uttam and Soumitra worked together. This is the second work with Tapan Sinha for both the actors. The film shooting held in Rajasthan and also shoot in Bengal, Bihar and Lucknow.

Uttam Kumar played duel role for the second time in his career after Tasher Ghar in 1957.B

Before starting work on the film, director Tapan Sinha told Uttam  to learn ride a horse. Then Uttam  used to get up at five in the morning and learning the ride his horse in the field. Absolutely rules. No matter how busy he is. It also gave results. Seeing him during the shooting, Tapan Sinha felt that this hero is not Uttamkumar, he look like a horse-rider.

Also need to learn swordplay for the film. Utram also agreed to that. Tapan Sinha then brought in a foreigner called  Massey Taylor who is an Olympic champion. Uttam copied Massey's movements exactly the director even Massey himself was shocked on Uttam's talent, skill and dedication.

Reception
The film regarded as one of the greatest Bengali film ever made. Uttam Kumar played one of the most popular duel role and give one of the finest performance in his career. But in a 2013 review in the Times of India said that "Here Soumitra was the antagonist and to some extent overshadowed protagonist Uttam Kumar. After ‘Jhinder Bondi’, many even fell in love with an antagonist Mayurbahon more than the protagonist Shankar Singh." The film became superhit at the box office.

References

External links 
 
Jhinder Bondi - Movie Profile (Seventymm)

Bengali-language Indian films
Films based on The Prisoner of Zenda
Indian historical drama films
Films directed by Tapan Sinha
Indian black-and-white films
1960s Bengali-language films
Films based on Indian novels
Films based on works by Saradindu Bandopadhyay